Frank Langford Hinde (5 April 1869 – 22 August 1931) was an Irish-born English cricketer. Hinde was a right-handed batsman. He was born at Rathfarnham, Leinster.

Hinde made a single first-class debut for Gloucestershire against Sussex in the 1895 County Championship at the County Ground, Hove. Gloucestershire won the toss and elected to bat first, making 151 all out, with Hinde batting at number three and being dismissed for 2 runs by Arthur Collins. In response, Sussex made 213 all out in their first-innings, to which Gloucestershire responded in their second-innings by making 146 all out, during which Hinde, who batted at number six in this innings, was dismissed for 3 runs by Collins. Set 85 to win, Sussex reached their target with six wickets to spare.

He died at Reigate, Surrey, on 22 August 1931.

References

External links
Frank Hinde at ESPNcricinfo
Frank Hinde at CricketArchive

1869 births
1931 deaths
Cricketers from Dublin (city)
Irish cricketers
English cricketers
Gloucestershire cricketers